Saint Elizabeth North Eastern is a parliamentary constituency represented in the Parliament of Jamaica. It elects one Member of Parliament by the first past the post system of election. The constituency covers the north west part of Saint Elizabeth Parish.

Representation

References 

Parliamentary constituencies of Jamaica